Terry C. Wallace Jr. (born June 30, 1956) is an American geophysicist. He was the 11th director of Los Alamos National Laboratory and the president of Los Alamos National Security, LLC. He became director on January 1, 2018, succeeding Charles F. McMillan.

Early life and education 
The son of the lab staff member Terry Wallace Sr. and the late Jeannette Wallace, a long-serving Republican member of the New Mexico State Legislature, Wallace was raised in Los Alamos, New Mexico and graduated from Los Alamos High School in 1974. He earned a Bachelor of Science degree in geophysics and mathematics from New Mexico Institute of Mining and Technology, followed by a Master of Science and PhD in geophysics from the California Institute of Technology.

Career
From 1983 to 2003, he was a professor at the University of Arizona and continues to author works in peer-reviewed journals and science magazines. He is also co-author of the college textbook Modern Global Seismology (1995,).

From 2011 to 2017, Wallace was the Laboratory's principal associate director for Global Security and the senior intelligence executive, overseeing national security programs including nuclear nonproliferation, counterproliferation, and industry partnerships. From 2006 to 2011, he was the Laboratory's principal associate director for Science, Technology, and Engineering, during which he implemented the capability model for scientists and engineers and developed the science pillars that guide the Laboratory's institutional investment strategies.

Wallace is an internationally recognized scientific authority in geophysics and forensic seismology, which is the study of earthquakes and seismic waves as they relate to nuclear weapons testing, and has evaluated more than 1,700 U.S. and foreign nuclear tests.

Awards and recognition
In 1992, he was named a fellow in the American Geophysical Union and served on the Board of Earth Sciences & Resources in the National Academy of Sciences from 2001 to 2008. He also served as vice president (1995) and president (1999-2000) of the Seismological Society of America. He served on the board of directors for the Mineralogical Record from 1990 to 1999, including as president from 1995 to 1997. He was also chairman of the Incorporated Research Institutions for Seismology (1994-1996) and is a current member of the Air Force Technical Applications Center‘s Seismic Review Panel (2000–present).

His awards include the Brown Medal (1978), the Langmuir Medal for Research (1985), the Macelwane Medal (1992), and the Carnegie Mineralogical Award (2002).

In 2011, a mineral Terrywallaceite was named after him in recognition of his efforts in education, research, and service to mineralogy.

Personal life
He is a wilderness runner and hiker. Wallace is a mineral collector, a hobby fostered by his father from an early age. He has visited mining communities and mineral localities across both North and South America, and has written extensively on various aspects of mineralogy for amateurs. He is the author of a popular mineral book Collecting Arizona (Lithographie,), which chronicles the mineral history of the Copper State.

He is married to geophysicist Michelle Hall and has one son and two grandchildren.

References

1956 births
American geophysicists
California Institute of Technology alumni
Living people
Los Alamos National Laboratory personnel
New Mexico Institute of Mining and Technology alumni
Scientists from New Mexico